Omorgus parvicollis is a species of hide beetle in the subfamily Omorginae.

References

parvicollis
Beetles described in 1986